The 1903 West Virginia Mountaineers football team was an American football team that represented West Virginia University as an independent during the 1903 college football season. In its first and only season under head coach Harry E. Trout, the team compiled a 7–1 record and outscored opponents by a combined total of 146 to 45. The team's only loss was to Ohio State by a 34–6 score. Harry M. Seamon was the team captain.

Schedule

References

West Virginia
West Virginia Mountaineers football seasons
West Virginia Mountaineers football